The Binjari Community Government Council was a local government area in the Northern Territory of Australia. It is located 15 minutes from Katherine, Northern Territory.

Suburbs

Meetings
2nd Thursday of every month.

See also
 Local Government Areas of the Northern Territory

References

External links
 LGWORKS:  Binjari Community Government Council 

Binjari